The PNS Ahsan is a naval base located in Makran, Balochistan Province. The base is named after legendary naval intelligence officer and former Chief of Naval Staff Vice-Admiral Syed Mohammad Ahsan. The base is currently controlled by the Pakistan Navy, and the base provides logistics support and surveillance systems operations to ensure the security of Pakistan Navy's infrastructure.

History

The administrative establishment of a naval base was led in 1970 under the command of Rear-Admiral Karamat Rahman Niazi who supervised the construction of the base. The base played an integral and important role in Balochistan conflict, where it had provided intelligence and logistic support to Pakistan Army. The base successfully applied an effective naval blockade of illegal arm smuggling in the Province. Later in the conflict, the base provided security to the Pakistan Navy's infrastructure and establishment in the Balochistan Province.

Formerly known as Remote Data Station Mianwali (RDSM), the base was renamed in the honour of former Chief of Naval Staff Vice-Admiral Syed Mohammad Ahsan. The base was commissioned on 30 October 1991, by Chief of Naval Staff Admiral Yastur-ul-Haq Malik The base is the garrison of the Southern Naval Command, and commands all the naval assets in the Province.

As of today, the base includes an airport and small naval dockyard. The base provided the logistic support to Jinnah Naval Base to expand the relief operations, codename Operation Madad, in the Balochistan Province and the upper Sindh Province.

On 7 June 2010, Naval Aviation's Aérospatiale Alouette III landed and stationed at PNS Ahsan.

The base supervised the distribution of more than 15000 kg relief goods to Gwadar affectees.

Roles and functions

The primary roles of the naval base is to provide the logistic support to JNB Space centre, Electronic intelligence (ELINT) collection, and co-ordinate Air defence of Ormara complex. The base also provides the refuelling facilities for HALO Operations of Special Service Group Navy (SSG[N]), and also provides secondary support and assistance in Search and rescue (SAR) operations.

References

External links
PNS Ahsan – Official Website
PNS Ahsan – Unofficial Website

Ahsan
Military installations in Balochistan, Pakistan
Ahsan